Tory Carter (born March 16, 1999) is a former American football fullback who is currently a free agent. He played college football at LSU.

Early life and high school
Carter grew up in Valdosta, Georgia and attended Lee County High School.

College career
Carter played for the LSU Tigers for four seasons. He played in 11 games and caught two passes for 15 yards as a junior as LSU won the 2020 College Football Playoff National Championship. Carter completed his collegiate career with two carries for four yards rushing and 16 receptions for 157 yards and two touchdowns in 42 games played.

Professional career

Carter was signed by the Tennessee Titans as an undrafted free agent on May 1, 2021. He was waived during final roster cuts on August 31, 2021, but was signed to the team's practice squad the next day. He was elevated to the active roster on September 26, 2021, for the team's week 3 game against the Indianapolis Colts and made his NFL debut in the game. He was signed to the active roster on October 30. Carter was placed on injured reserve on December 18 after he suffered an ankle injury in the team's week 14 win against the Jacksonville Jaguars.

The Titans waived Carter on December 6, 2022.

References

External links
LSU Tigers bio
Tennessee Titans bio

1999 births
Living people
Players of American football from Georgia (U.S. state)
American football fullbacks
Tennessee Titans players
LSU Tigers football players